Van der Hoeven (Vanderhoeven) or Van der Hoeve is a surname of noble Dutch family. People with the name include:

Abraham Pruijs van der Hoeven (1829–1907), Dutch colonial governor of Aceh
Agnes van Ardenne-van der Hoeven (b. 1950), Dutch politician
:nl:Cees van der Hoeven (b. 1947), Dutch businessman, CEO of Ahold from 1993 to 2003
:de:Cornelis van der Hoeven (1792–1871), Dutch physician
Jan van der Hoeve (1878–1952), Dutch ophthalmologist
Jan van der Hoeven (1801–1868), Dutch zoologist and author
Joris van der Hoeven (b. 1971), Dutch mathematician and computer scientist
Maria van der Hoeven (b. 1949), Dutch politician and government minister
Mirna van der Hoeven (b. 1944), Dutch sprinter
Rolph van der Hoeven (b. 1948), Dutch Economist
Willem van der Hoeven (b. 1944), Dutch businessman and football club manager

See also
Verhoeven

Dutch-language surnames
Surnames of Dutch origin